A voting advice application or voting aid application (VAA) or vote matcher or vote compass or election compass is a Web application that helps voters find a candidate or a party that stands closest to their preferences. VAAs are a new phenomenon in modern election campaigning.

In some of the countries with popular VAAs an intense debate has broken out. Some maintain that VAAs are a fraud that can never give correct and neutral voting advice. Others contend that these applications must be commended as they focus people’s attention on the party programmes and on policy issues, compelling parties to discuss substance instead of personalities, images and campaign events.

A study of VAAs by the University of Antwerp ends with a plea for a careful selection of VAA statements and for a proper process of benchmarking based on survey data. Without appropriate calibrating VAAs produce invalid results.

VAA questionnaires should be completed by the candidate or party for maximum accuracy, but also VAAs completed by the journalist are published, with supposed positions taken from party programmes and debates.

Usage
In 2007, of 22 European countries, 15 had at least one VAA. Some of the most successful ones were the Dutch Stemwijzer with 4.7 million consultations in 2006 (40% of the electorate) and the German Wahl-O-Mat with 6.7 million consultations in 2009 (12% of the electorate). Research showed that usage was higher in countries with proportional electoral systems and a larger number of parliamentary political parties, including Belgium, Finland, the Netherlands and Switzerland.

In Finland, the VotingAid phenomenon has even produced a little rivalry between the most popular news channels and voters eagerly compare the results between different VAA's. Out of Finland's electorate of 4,3 million, it is reported that over 20% of them found voting advice on the most popular VAA, launched by MTV3.

Effects on voting behaviour
Empirical research has indicated three ways in which voting behavior can be influenced by VAAs: by motivating users to engage in further research about party policies, motivating participation in the election and affecting vote intentions. A 2005 survey in Germany reported that more than half of the VAA users declared to have been motivated to do further research after taking the test. The effect of motivating participation has been confirmed by several surveys, and quantified as 22% in the 2003 elections in Finland, 8% in the 2005 elections in Germany elections and 12% in the 2003 elections in the Netherlands. The proportion of voters declaring to have changed their preferences as result of VAA has been 3% in Finland, 6% in Germany and 10% in the Netherlands, however a post-election survey conducted in Belgium showed only 1% actual change. The floating, undecided voters, however, have received a lot more help by VAA's. In a study conducted in Finland, three out of four voters say that the VAA has some effect on their voting decision. VAA helps one person out of four to make the decision straight based on the VAA's results.

On an internal, psychological level, Eric Armstrong argues that "not wanting to feel ignorant" causes voters to stay home. Rather than facing ballot choices on dozens of candidates and issues they know nothing about it, voters sit it out. They also stay home because their vote doesn't matter, either because it is superfluous (they are part of the majority) or pointless (they are part of the minority). And then there is the difficulty of acquiring and comparing information, and evaluating it's reliability—especially in era when a "Clean Water Act" can be one that opens the door to increased pollution. Who or what is the voter to trust?

A Voting Advice Application can help to address those issues—if it is under the voter's control. Last century's answer was the "party slate"—the set of choices preferred by a given political party. But that option led to a concentration of power in the hands of the parties. Such a "single-source" Voting Advice Application is to Social Media Voting Advice what the Editorial Page is to Twitter. One gives you access to millions of feeds, from which you choose sources you trust. The other gives you a handful of selected sources that the provider deems worthy.

Benefits for democracy
Although the help that voters receive from VAA is proven to be great, it is not the only benefit that VAA's produce. Most of the VAA's collect and save the data given by users anonymously and that way they are able to create reports that show the overall opinion of that country's political status. Some of VAA tools are more sophisticated in the reporting, and they can generate automatically many kind of different reports such as average distribution reports, comparisons between parties or voter groups and between voters and candidates. These different reporting methods help for example media channels to create interesting news and raise topics of conversation in debates. The best case of democracy-making is to have the candidates answer personally on VAA's statements. This way the VAA automatically generates full see-through to the politics, everyone can see what the candidates think. Changing your opinions is a lot harder when your answers on hot political topics are in public for everyone to see.

But the benefits for democracy go well beyond the gathering of statistics. Eric Armstrong argues that social media voting advice can raise voter turnout by providing convenient, "one stop shopping" for advice up and down the ballot, all from (and only from) trusted advisors the voter has subscribed to. Such advice can launch the careers of local candidates the voter might otherwise never have heard of, or pay attention to. And it can end the corrosive effect of the huge campaign contributions required to pay for the advertising that (today) is needed to win, and make elected officials more responsive to the electorate than their donors.

Election Compass USA
Election Compass USA, developed in cooperation with the Wall Street Journal, was presented on January 2, 2008. Election Compass USA provides information about the 2008 US presidential elections. Within 3 weeks 1 million people visited Election Compass USA. At the end of the campaign, up to 3.8 million people used the website to obtain information about the candidates.

Israel Election Compass
In collaboration with the Israel Democracy Institute a compass was developed for the Israeli Knesset elections of 2009. Over 40.000 voters visited the website in the first hour after launch alone. Around election day, a total number of 600.000 people visited the compass.

EU Profiler
Together with the European University Institute and the Swiss Smartvote, Election Compass created the EU Profiler, a voting advice website for the European Parliament election in 2009.

List of apps
Vote Compass - United States, Canada, Australia, New Zealand, France, and Germany
smartvote - Switzerland
Kieskompas - Netherlands
Vote Match - UK and EU
Wahl-O-Mat - Germany

References

 “Voting Aid Applications between charlatanism and political science: the effect of statement selection”, University of Antwerp.
 Cedroni, L. & Garzia, D. (eds.): Voting Advice Applications in Europe: The State of the Art, Napoli: ScriptaWeb, 2010.

Politics and technology
Voting